Badavi Ruslanovich Guseynov (born 11 July 1991) is a professional footballer who plays as a defender for Azerbaijan Premier League side Qarabağ and the Azerbaijan national team.

Club career
Badavi Guseynov is a product of Dagestani football. In 2007 he joined FC Dagdizel Kaspiysk. In August 2010 he moved to the Anzhi Makhachkala youth team. Despite being a captain of the youth team, he didn't make his senior debut for Anzhi and he moved to Azerbaijani club Sumgayit on loan for 2011/12 season. In the summer of 2012 he signed with Qarabağ.

In 2015, Guseynov turned down a return to FC Anzhi Makhachkala to sign a new contract with Qarabağ until the summer of 2018.

International career

Under 21 and Youth
August 18, 2011, along with his teammate Michael Zaitsev was invited to a training camp of the Azerbaijan U-21 in Germany Frankfurt, which took place from 22 to 29 August [5] . For the youth team debuted in the qualifying match for the European championship among youth teams in 2013, having played the entire match against England U21.

Senior Team
In February 2012, he was called to the national team, was also included in the team for the match against Singapore, which took place in the UAE, but the field was never released. [7] He made his debut for the national team on February 29 in a match against Palestine.

Career statistics

Club

International

Honours
Qarabağ
Azerbaijan Premier League: (7) 2013–14, 2014–15, 2015–16, 2016–17, 2017–18, 2018–19, 2019–20
Azerbaijan Cup: (2) 2014–15, 2015–16

References

External links
 Бадави Гусейнов: БЫТЬ КАПИТАНОМ — РЕШЕНИЕ ТРЕНЕРА 
 

1991 births
Living people
Russian footballers
Association football defenders
People from Kaspiysk
Azerbaijani footballers
Azerbaijan international footballers
Azerbaijani expatriate footballers
Azerbaijani people of Dagestani descent
Russian people of Dagestani descent
FC Anzhi Makhachkala players
Sumgayit FK players
Qarabağ FK players
Azerbaijan Premier League players
Sportspeople from Dagestan